

People
 Alfred C. Sikes (born 1939), former chairman of the Federal Communications Commission
 Bartholomew Sikes (died 1803), British excise officer, inventor of the standard hydrometer for alcohol proof
 Bob Sikes (1906–1994), U.S. Representative from Florida
 Cynthia Sikes (born 1954), American actress
 Dan Sikes (1929–1987), American golfer
 Elisabeth Sikes, American geoscientist 
 James Sikes, made international headlines by driving his reportedly runaway Toyota Prius
 Jules V. Sikes (1904–1964), American athlete and coach
 Stuart Sikes, American recording engineer
 Wirt Sikes (1836–1883), American journalist and writer

Fictional people
 Bill Sikes, from the novel Oliver Twist by Charles Dickens

Places in the United States
 Sikes, Louisiana
 Sikes Township, Mountrail County, North Dakota

See also 
 Sike (disambiguation)
 Sykes (disambiguation)